First Church of Christ, Scientist was a Prairie School church building located at 412 West Main Street, in Marshalltown, Iowa, United States. Designed by architect, Hugh M.G. Garden, it was once on the National Register of Historic Places, but was bulldozed in August, 1985, and was later removed from the National Register.

National register listing
First Church of Christ, Scientist ** (added 1998 - Building - #79000915)
412 W. Main St., Marshalltown
Historic Significance: 	Architecture/Engineering
Architect, builder, or engineer: 	Garden, Hugh M.G.
Architectural Style: 	Prairie School
Area of Significance: 	Architecture
Period of Significance: 	1900-1924
Owner: 	Private
Historic Function: 	Religion
Historic Sub-function: 	Religious Structure
Current Function: 	Religion
Current Sub-function: 	Religious Structure

Gallery

See also
List of Registered Historic Places in Iowa
List of former Christian Science churches, societies and buildings
First Church of Christ, Scientist (disambiguation)

References

External links
 National Register listings for Marshall County, Iowa
 National Register Weekly List, 5/22/98
 Prairie School Traveler
 Book on Christian Science Churches
Hugh Garden
 Library of Congress search: put in the name of this article to pull up holdings with 2 images

Churches completed in 1903
20th-century Christian Science church buildings
Buildings and structures in Marshalltown, Iowa
National Register of Historic Places in Marshall County, Iowa
Churches on the National Register of Historic Places in Iowa
Former Christian Science churches, societies and buildings in Iowa
Demolished churches in the United States
Former National Register of Historic Places in Iowa
Buildings and structures demolished in 1985
Demolished buildings and structures in Iowa
Former churches in Iowa